Spirit of London may refer to:

A prototype Alexander Dennis Enviro400 type London bus, named Spirit of London, which replaced the vehicle destroyed on 7 July 2005 by a terrorist bomb.
A cruise liner constructed by Cantieri Navali del Tirreno & Riuniti, named Spirit of London, launched in 1972 and subsequently renamed MV Ocean Dream. 
An annual award ceremony launched in 2009 by the Damilola Taylor Trust, named Spirit of London Awards, intended to encourage talented young people.